The Women's Overall competition in the 2023 FIS Alpine Skiing World Cup is currently scheduled to consist of 38 events in four disciplines: downhill (DH) (9 races), Super-G (SG) (8 races), giant slalom (GS) (10 races), and slalom (SL) (11 races).  The fifth and sixth disciplines, parallel (PAR). and Alpine combined (AC), have had all events in the 2022–23 season cancelled, either due to the schedule disruption cased by the COVID-19 pandemic (AC) or due to bad weather (PAR). The original schedule called for 42 races, but in addition to the parallel, two downhills and a Super-G have been cancelled during the season.

The season was interrupted by the 2023 World Ski Championships in the linked resorts of Courchevel and Méribel, France, which are located in Les Trois Vallées, from 6–19 February 2023.

Season Summary
From the very first race of the season, defending champion (and four-time overall champion) Mikaela Shiffrin of the United States seized the lead in the standings due to her abilities in all four disciplines.  After the first thirteen races, she had built over a 300-point lead over 2021 overall champion Petra Vlhová of Slovakia.  In addition, with her victory in a slalom at Semmering, Austria on December 29, Shiffrin, 27, became only the third skier (and second woman) to win 80 World Cup races, as well as the first ever to win 50 races in a single discipline. 

After 24 races, almost two-thirds of the season, Shiffrin held a lead of over 500 points over Vlhová, with Lara Gut-Behrami of Switzerland close behind in third; however, the focus of the moment was on Shiffrin's quest to break Lindsey Vonn's all-time women's record of 82 World Cup victories (which she had already tied) and then Ingemar Stenmark's all-time overall record of 86 such victories. She shattered Vonn's record with victories in back-to-back giant slaloms in Kronplatz on 24-25 January, increasing her overall lead (now with Gut-Behrami in second) to over 600 points. 

By the end of January, which was the time for the break for the 2023 World Ski Championships, Shiffrin had 11 wins on the season (1 in Super-G and 5 each in giant slalom and slalom) and 85 wins for her career. Shiffrin's fifth-place finish in a downhill at Kvitfjell on 4 March was sufficient to clinch the season championship, although there were still seven races left in the season. The overall title represented Shiffrin's fifth, tying her with Luxembourg's Marc Girardelli, who also won five, and placed her behind only two Austrians: Annemarie Moser-Pröll, who won six in the 1970s, and Marcel Hirscher, who won eight in a row in the 2010s. 

Shiffrin's later victories in both a giant slalom and a slalom at Åre, Sweden (her sixth of the season in each discipline) enabled her to equal and then break Ingemar Stenmark's all-time overall record of 86 World Cup wins (with 87), as well as tying Vreni Schneider's all-time women's record of 20 giant slalom victories (to go along with her all-time record 53 slalom wins, plus 5 Super-Gs, 5 parallels, 3 downhills, and 1 combined).. And to top the season off a week later, Shiffrin won the giant slalom at finals, breaking Schneider's women's career victory record in that discipline with 21 and also breaking Lindsey Vonn's record for career World Cup podiums with 138 (in only her 249th World Cup start).

Finals
The last events of the season took place at the World Cup finals, Wednesday, 15 March 2023 through Sunday, 19 March 2023 in Soldeu, Andorra.  Only the top 25 in each specific discipline for the season and the winner of the Junior World Championship in each discipline were eligible to compete in the final, with the exception that any skier who has scored at least 500 points in the overall classification was eligible to participate in any discipline, regardless of her standing in that discipline for the season.

Standings

See also
 2023 Alpine Skiing World Cup – Women's summary rankings
 2023 Alpine Skiing World Cup – Women's Downhill
 2023 Alpine Skiing World Cup – Women's Super-G
 2023 Alpine Skiing World Cup – Women's Giant Slalom
 2023 Alpine Skiing World Cup – Women's Slalom
 2023 Alpine Skiing World Cup – Men's Overall
 World Cup scoring system

References

External links
 Alpine Skiing at FIS website

Women's overall
FIS Alpine Ski World Cup overall titles